The 1991 Miami Hurricanes football team represented the University of Miami during the 1991 NCAA Division I-A football season. It was the Hurricanes' 66th season of football and first as a member of the Big East Conference. The Hurricanes were led by third-year head coach Dennis Erickson and played their home games at the Orange Bowl. They finished the season 12–0 overall and 2–0 in the Big East while playing a partial conference schedule. They were invited to the Orange Bowl where they defeated Nebraska, 22–0. The Hurricanes were named as national champions by the AP Poll, the program's fourth national championship. The Washington Huskies, who also finished 12–0 overall, were named as champions by the Coaches Poll.

Personnel

Coaching staff

Support staff

Roster

Schedule

Rankings

Season summary

Arkansas

Houston

Tulsa

    
    
    
    
    
        

    

Gino Torretta 20/33, 327 Yds
Lamar Thomas 5 Rec, 106 Yds

Oklahoma State

Penn State

    
    
    
    
    
    
    
    
    

First meeting between the two schools since 1987 Fiesta Bowl
Fans watching on television outside of Florida missed two scores when the network switched to United States Supreme Court nominee Clarence Thomas testifying before the Senate Judiciary Committee
Horace Copeland 5 Rec, 106 Yds

Long Beach State

Arizona

West Virginia

Florida State

Boston College

San Diego State

vs. Nebraska (Orange Bowl)

Awards and honors

First Team All-Americans
Leon Searcy, T
Darrin Smith, LB
Darryl Williams, FS
Kevin Williams, KR/PR
Carlos Huerta, K

Awards Finalists
Bold indicates winners
Darrin Smith, LB - Big East Co-Defensive Player of the Year
Gino Torretta, QB - Big East Offensive Player of the Year
Kevin Williams, KR/PR - Big East Special Teams Player of the Year

•  Russell Sapp, RB/KR/PR -Big East Co-Special Teams Player of the Year

Jack Harding University of Miami MVP Award
Carlos Huerta, K

Other notable players
Dwayne "The Rock" Johnson, DT
Finesse Mitchell
Russell Sapp, RB

1992 NFL Draft

References

Miami
Miami Hurricanes football seasons
College football national champions
Orange Bowl champion seasons
College football undefeated seasons
Miami Hurricanes football